This is a list of episodes for the series Almost Naked Animals. It debuted on YTV on January 7, 2011 and concluded its run in Canada on May 22, 2013.

Series overview

Episodes

PILOT (2010)

"Island Animals"

Island Animal - in Beginning, first day of The Summer.

Season 1 (2011)

Season 2 (2012)

Season 3 (2013)

References 

Lists of Canadian children's animated television series episodes